Raft River National Forest was established as the Raft River Forest Reserve in Utah and Idaho on November 5, 1906 with . It became a National Forest on March 4, 1907 and was named after the Raft River Mountains, which it contained. On July 1, 1908 it was combined with Cassia National Forest to create Minidoka National Forest. The name was discontinued. The land is now part of Sawtooth National Forest as the Raft River Division of the Minidoka Ranger District.

References

External links
Forest History Society
Listing of the National Forests of the United States and Their Dates (from the Forest History Society website) Text from Davis, Richard C., ed. Encyclopedia of American Forest and Conservation History. New York: Macmillan Publishing Company for the Forest History Society, 1983. Vol. II, pp. 743-788.

Former National Forests of Idaho
Former National Forests of Utah